Sasha Stone is an American film blogger based in Los Angeles. She is the founder and editor of the film/awards discussion website Awards Daily (formerly known as Oscarwatch).

Biography
Sasha Stone grew up in Topanga and Ojai, California, and went to Nordhoff High School. She studied film at New York University and Columbia University, and eventually graduated from the University of California, Los Angeles. She won third place in the Samuel Goldwyn Writing Awards competition at UCLA in 1993. She has one daughter.

Stone has written for various entertainment industry magazines, including Variety, The Hollywood Reporter, and The Wrap, and was also the film critic for the Santa Monica Mirror. She founded a website covering the Academy Awards called Oscarwatch in 1998. The website was later renamed Awards Daily after Stone was sued in 2006 by the Academy of Motion Picture Arts and Sciences for using Oscarwatch as the site's name for eight years prior. Since its founding, the website has received a Shorty Award nomination. Additionally, Stone has appeared on NPR's Weekend Edition.

Following the Boston Marathon bombings of 2013, Stone was featured in a New York Times article about how quickly false information can spread in moments of crisis on Twitter. She wrote her own account of the night in question on her personal blog.

In 2014, Stone was profiled by Boris Kachka in New York Magazine about the growing industry of Oscar punditry, which Stone helped launch with Awards Daily.

Stone is also a writer on the Netflix series Voir, alongside the critics Tony Zhou, Taylor Ramos, Walter Chaw, Drew McWeeny, and David Prior,  and producers Prior and David Fincher. Her episode The Summer of the Shark, focusing on the experience of seeing Jaws at the age of 10, aired on December 6, 2021,.

References

External links
 
 Awards Daily
 Twitter

1965 births
American film critics
Columbia University School of the Arts alumni
Living people
People from Ojai, California
People from Topanga, California
Tisch School of the Arts alumni
UCLA Film School alumni
American women film critics
20th-century American journalists
Variety (magazine) people
American bloggers
American women bloggers
American women journalists